The Cane Pace is a harness horse race for standardbred pacers run annually since 1955. The race was first run as the William H. Cane Futurity in 1955 at Yonkers Raceway in New York. In 1956 the race joined with the Little Brown Jug and the Messenger Stakes to become the first leg in the Triple Crown of Harness Racing for Pacers.

The Cane Pace of 2004 resulted in the only dead heat in the race's history and one where the two horses had the same trainer and owner.

As of 2015, the Cane Pace is run at the Meadowlands Racetrack in New Jersey as part of the undercard for the Hambletonian Stakes, the first leg of the Triple Crown of Harness Racing for Trotters.

Distances
2016–present: 1 1/8 miles (1810.5 metres, 9.5 furlongs) (If 12 horses start)
1963–present : 1 mile (1609.3 metres, 8 furlongs) (If no more than 11 horses start)
1955–1962 : 1 1/16 miles  (1709.9 metres, 8.5 furlongs)

Locations
1955–1997 - Yonkers Raceway
1998–2010 - Freehold Raceway
2011 - Pocono Downs (Originally scheduled for Tioga Downs but had to be moved due to flooding)
2012–2014 - Tioga Downs
2015–present - Meadowlands Racetrack

Records 
 Most wins by a driver
 5 – John Campbell (1985, 1989, 1990, 2002, 2004)

 Most wins by a trainer
 4 – Stanley Dancer (1970, 1971, 1973, 1976)

 Stakes record
 1:47 3/5 – Dealt A Winner (2015)

Cane Pace winners

References

Yonkers Raceway
Meadowlands Racetrack
Harness races in the United States
Harness races for three-year-old pacers
Recurring sporting events established in 1955
Cane Pace winners
United States Triple Crown of Harness Racing
1955 establishments in New York (state)